Gregory John Barrington Mills (born 9 May 1962) heads the Brenthurst Foundation, based in Johannesburg, South Africa, established in 2005 by the Oppenheimers to strengthen African economic performance.

Early life and education
Mills was born to Denis Arthur Barrington Mills and Nanette Mary How Elliott - and is a grandson of pre-war South African Grand Prix driver William Arthur Frank "Billy" Mills. Mills holds a BA Honours from the University of Cape Town, and an MA and a PhD from the University of Lancaster.

Career
From 1996-2005 he served as the National Director of the South African Institute of International Affairs. He has lectured at the University of the Western Cape and currently at the Centre for Defence & International Security Studies in Lancaster. He is a visiting lecturer at the NATO Higher Defence College in Rome, and is a Fellow of the Royal Society of Arts.

An accomplished author of several books, he is also widely published in newspapers and magazines including the International Herald Tribune, New York Times, Time, Sydney Morning Herald, Financial Times, Straits Times, Die Welt and Politiken.

He is a Research Associate of the Centre for Defence and International Security Studies (CDISS), a Member of Council and Associate Fellow of the Royal United Services Institute for Defence and Security Studies (RUSI), and a Member of the International Institute for Strategic Studies (IISS). He serves on a number of international editorial boards.

During 2006, based in Kabul, he served as the special adviser to the Commander of NATO forces in Afghanistan, General Sir David Richards, and as the head of the strategic analysis Prism Group of the ninth International Security Assistance Force (ISAF IX). During 2008 he was on secondment to the Government of Rwanda as Strategic Adviser to the President. In April 2008 he was appointed as a Commissioner on the Danish Prime Minister's 'Africa Commission'.

Personal life
He is married to the artist Janet Margaret Wilson. They have three children, Amelia, Beatrix, and William.

In his free time, Mills' hobbies include restoring and racing vintage racing cars. He is a co-author of five books on southern African motorsport. These include: 
 For the Love of It: John Love and an Era of Southern African Motorsport (2005)
 Springbok Series: An Era of Sports and Saloon Car Racing in Southern Africa (2006)
 "Love First, Tingle Second"’: Sam Tingle’s Motorsport Scrapbook (2006); 
 "PIPES!" David Piper and the Springbok Series (2007).
 "Paddy - Who?" A Driver's life of Bikes and Cars (2009).

Mills is widely known for his proficiency on the penny whistle, accompanying musician Robin Auld on his song, "This Is How It Works."

Publications

Books
 
 
 
 
 
 Mills, Greg, J. Peter Pham, and David Kilcullen (2013). "Somalia: Fixing Africa’s Most Failed State." Cape Town: Tafelberg Short.

References

External links
Greg Mills - How South Africa Works And Must Do Better
RSIS Distinguished Public Lecture by Dr Greg Mills

1962 births
Living people
University of Cape Town alumni
Alumni of Lancaster University
South African non-fiction writers
South African social scientists
South African political scientists
Academic staff of the University of the Western Cape